Slonina or Słonina is a surname. Notable people with the surname include:

Gabriel Slonina (born 2004), Polish American goalkeeper
Jimmy Slonina, actor
Łukasz Słonina (born 1989), Polish biathlete
Nicholas Slonina (born 2001), Polish American soccer player
Patricia Slonina, first woman editor of the literary magazine, The Alembic at Providence College
Robin Barcus Slonina (born 1971), American artist
Stanisław Słonina, 2007 Per Artem ad Deum Medal

See also
Salo (food), known as słonina in Polish

Polish-language surnames